The 2014 German Darts Championship was the first of eight PDC European Tour events on the 2014 PDC Pro Tour. The tournament took place at Halle 39 in Hildesheim, Germany, between 31 January–2 February 2014. It featured a field of 48 players and £100,000 in prize money, with £20,000 going to the winner.

Gary Anderson won his first and last European Tour event by defeating Justin Pipe 6–5 in the final.

Beginning with this event, all European Tour events are streamed live and free on the PDC YouTube channel.

Prize money

Qualification and format
The top 16 players from the PDC ProTour Order of Merit on the 17 January 2014 automatically qualified for the event. In a change from previous European Tour events, this year there will be 48 players in each tournament instead of 64. Players who reach the event via qualifiers will play each other in the first round with the winners meeting the 16 seeded players in the last 32. 20 places were on offer at the UK Open Qualifier held in Wigan on 19 January. Eight and four places were awarded in the European and Host Nation Qualifiers respectively, which were held at the venue the day before the event started.

The following players took part in the tournament:

Top 16
  Michael van Gerwen (quarter-finals)
  Dave Chisnall  (second round)
  Peter Wright (second round)
  Brendan Dolan (second round)
  Kim Huybrechts (third round)
  Robert Thornton (third round)
  Jamie Caven (second round)
  Steve Beaton (second round)
  Wes Newton (third round)
  Mervyn King (third round)
  Ian White (quarter-finals)
  John Part (quarter-finals)
  Paul Nicholson (third round)
  Gary Anderson (winner)
  Adrian Lewis (third round)
  Kevin Painter (second round)

UK Qualifier 
  Stuart Kellett (second round)
  Andy Hamilton (second round)
  Ronnie Baxter (semi-finals)
  Justin Pipe (runner-up)
  Matt Padgett (first round)
  Barry Lynn (first round)
  Steve Maish (first round)
  Richie Burnett (first round)
  Terry Jenkins (third round)
  Wayne Jones (third round)
  Michael Smith (second round)
  Mark Dudbridge (first round)
  Marc Dewsbury (first round)
  Dean Winstanley (second round)
  Brian Woods (first round)
  Joey Palfreyman (second round)
  Mark Walsh (first round)
  Jamie Bain (first round)
  Glenn Spearing (second round)
  Lee Palfreyman (second round)

European Qualifier
  Magnus Caris (first round)
  Raymond van Barneveld (quarter-finals)
  Dick van Dijk (second round)
  Jelle Klaasen (semi-finals)
  Dirk van Duijvenbode (second round)
  Dimitri Van den Bergh (first round)
  Leon de Geus (second round)
  Ron Meulenkamp (first round)

Host Nation Qualifier
  Tomas Seyler (first round)
  Fabian Herz (first round)
  Max Hopp (first round)
  René Eidams (first round)

Draw

References

2014
2014 PDC European Tour
2014 in German sport
Sport in Hildesheim